Georges Marret (? - 9 May 1937), was a French film producer and film director.

Filmography

Producer 
1931:  by Jean Choux 
1932:  by Léo Joannon and Raymond Rouleau
1933:  by Roger Goupillières and Louis Jouvet 
1934: Jeanne

Director 
1934: Jeanne

Scriptwriter 
1938:  by Fernand Rivers, with Lys Gauty, cowriter

External links 

French directors
20th-century French screenwriters
French producers
1937 deaths
Year of birth missing